Oliver Fahy (born 21 October 1975) is an Irish hurler who played as a full-forward for the Galway senior team.

Fahy joined the team during the 1994-95 National League and subsequently became a regular member of the starting fifteen until his retirement after the 2004 National League. During that time he won five consecutive Connacht medals and two National League medals.

At club level Fahy is a one-time county club championship medalist with Gort.

References

1975 births
Living people
Gort hurlers
Galway inter-county hurlers
Connacht inter-provincial hurlers